Ludovic Lafoudre (born 1 December 1987) is a Mauritian football midfielder for AS Port-Louis 2000.

References

1987 births
Living people
Mauritian footballers
Mauritius international footballers
AS Port-Louis 2000 players
Association football midfielders